Bayley Sironen (born 23 December 1996) is an Australian professional rugby league footballer who plays as a  and  for the New Zealand Warriors in the NRL.

He previously played for the Wests Tigers and the South Sydney Rabbitohs in the National Rugby League.

Background
Sironen was born in Sydney, New South Wales, Australia. He is the younger brother of St Helens player Curtis Sironen, and son of Australian international Paul Sironen.

Sironen played his junior rugby league for the Holy Cross Rhinos, before being signed by the Wests Tigers.

Playing career

Early career
In July 2014, Sironen was named in the Australian Schoolboys rugby league squad. In 2015 and 2016, he played for the Wests Tigers' NYC team. In July 2016, he played for the New South Wales under-20s team against the Queensland under-20s team.

2017
In 2017, Sironen graduated to the Tigers' Intrust Super Premiership NSW team. In round 25 of the 2017 NRL season, he made his NRL debut for the Tigers against the North Queensland Cowboys. He was contracted to the Tigers until the end of 2018.

2018
In 2018, Sironen was selected to play for the New South Wales Residents against the Queensland Residents side.
On September 5, Sironen signed a one year deal to join South Sydney for the 2019 season after failing to secure a first grade spot with Wests.

2019
Sironen made his debut for an Origin depleted South Sydney side (first grade player #1151) in round 12 of the 2019 NRL season against Parramatta which ended in a 14-26 defeat at the new Western Sydney Stadium.

2020
In round 7 of the 2020 NRL season, Sironen scored his first try in the top grade as South Sydney were defeated by Penrith 20-12 at Bankwest Stadium.

Sironen played 19 games throughout the season including South Sydney's preliminary final defeat against Penrith.

On 20 November, he signed a three-year contract with New Zealand.

2021
In round 1 of the 2021 NRL season, he scored a try on debut for New Zealand in a 19-6 victory over the Gold Coast.
Sironen played 19 games for New Zealand in the 2021 NRL season where the club finished 12th on the table and missed the finals.

2022
Sironen made a total of 13 appearances for the New Zealand Warriors in the 2022 NRL season as they finished 15th on the table.

References

External links

New Zealand Warriors profile
South Sydney Rabbitohs profile
Wests Tigers profile

1996 births
Living people
Australian people of Finnish descent
Australian rugby league players
New Zealand Warriors players
Rugby league second-rows
Rugby league locks
Rugby league players from Sydney
South Sydney Rabbitohs players
Wests Tigers NSW Cup players
Wests Tigers players
Western Suburbs Magpies NSW Cup players